Muhammad Haroon (A. N. May, AN MAY, "May, Alfred N." or ALFRED N. MAY)  1944–1998 was a British PhD Scholar of Cambridge University. He got his PhD degree in 1970. The topic of his PhD Thesis was "The franchise in thirteenth century England, with special reference to the estates of the bishopric of Winchester". He converted to Islam from Christianity in 1988 when he was 44 years old.

Alfred Neville May had been a communist during his teen-age years.

Works

He wrote more than one dozen book about Islam after accepting Islam. The Raza Academy UK published many of his works. A few of the titles of those works are as follows:
 World Importance of Imam Ahmad Raza Khan Barelvi 1994
 How to Achieve Muslim Unity 
 A warning to Muslim about Hizb ut Tahrir 
 The Social Structure of Islam: The Nature of Society in Traditional Islam 
 The Surah Ya Sin 
 World Importance of Ghaus al Azam Hazrat Sheikh Muhyiddin Abdul Qadir Jilani 1995	
 Why I Accepted Islam 1990 
 Rule of Allah Alone: Sunni Islam's Answers to the Problems of the Modern World 1994 
 Reform Policy of Imam Ahmad Raza Barelvi 1997 
 Islamic Concept of State 1997 
 Islam and Women 1995 
 Islam and Punishment 1993 
 Islam and Alcohol 1994  Read it online here.
 Importance of the 1912 Four-Point Programme of Imam Ahmad Raza Khan Barelvi (Rahmatullahi Alaih) and How to Carry it Out 1996 
 Importance and Truth of the Quran 1994 
 Eid Milad An Nabi: (Birthday of the Holy Prophet) – Sall Allahu Alaihi Wa Sallam 1994 
 Why I Accepted Islam Apr 1994 
 Islam and the Limits of Science 1995

References

1944 births
English Sufis
Scholars of Sufism
Converts to Islam from atheism or agnosticism
English Sunni Muslim scholars of Islam
20th-century Muslim scholars of Islam
Sunni Muslim scholars of Islam
Alumni of the University of Cambridge
1998 deaths
Translators of the Quran into English
20th-century translators